Young Scot is a national information and citizenship organisation supported by the Scottish Government for young people aged 11–25 in Scotland. 

The declared aim of the organisation is to make young people informed, incentivised and active citizens through the information they provide.

Young Scot also provides opportunities for young people across Scotland in order to help develop their educational and professional development. One example of this would be the Youth Commission on Alcohol.

The organisation issues the Young Scot National Entitlement Card to young people aged 11–25. This provides cardholders with discounts for goods and services across Scotland and certain European countries. The card also allows free bus travel for under-22s. As well as being part of the National Entitlement Card Programme that runs in Scotland  it is also a proof of age card accredited by the Proof of Age Standards Scheme (PASS) scheme which applies across the United Kingdom.

Young Scot also have a rewards scheme where users can earn reward points and then in turn collect rewards.

The CEO of Young Scot for ten years was Louise Macdonald, OBE, in 2021 became National Director of the Institute of Directors.

References

External links

Youth employment
Youth organisations based in Scotland